The Hendricks Confectionery Building at 19 W. Main St. in Richmond, Utah, was built around 1909.  It was listed on the National Register of Historic Places in 2004.

It is a two-part commercial block building with Late Victorian and Classical Revival ornamentation.  It served as a confectionery for about 30 years then became a pharmacy, Richmond Drugs.

References

Confectionery stores
National Register of Historic Places in Cache County, Utah
Victorian architecture in Utah
Neoclassical architecture in Utah
Buildings and structures completed in 1909